Vasili Aleksandrovich Lukichev (born 31 December 1991) is a Russian professional football coach and a former goalkeeper. He is the goalkeeping coach with FC Strogino Moscow.

Club career
He made his Russian Football National League debut for FC Tosno on 2 April 2016 in a game against FC Tyumen.

External links
 

1991 births
Footballers from Moscow
Living people
Russian footballers
Association football goalkeepers
FC Tosno players
FC Lokomotiv Moscow players
FC Strogino Moscow players